Sekolah Menengah Kebangsaan Ahmad Boestamam is an SMK (national secondary school) in the Sitiawan region of Malaysia named after Ahmad Boestamam, a historical figure who helped in gaining independence from the British. The school used to be known as SMK Sitiawan.  The school is fully government-funded and follows the Integrated Curriculum for Secondary Schools syllabus.

Founded in 1972, it started with 298 students. In 2007 the number of students enrolled in the school was 1511. It takes students from Form 1 to Form 6 from Manjung District. The school is run by 112 teachers and 15 staff. Since 2004 the principal has been En Ahmad Rosidi b. Ramley.

Location 

About 1.5 km from KFC Sitiawan, towards kg Acheh. Located along the Haji Mohamad Ali Road it can be accessed through two gates at Taman Terus Maju. The front gate is closed to visitors.

Achievements 
It has been named a five-star school by the Ministry of Education of Malaysia. It has also won the state level cleanliness, safety and landscaping competition.

Students from the school have entered the Langkawi International Regatta, national sailing competitions, marathon, football, hockey, taekwondo, chess, silat, and badminton championships.

Facilities
The school has a small mosque, hostel for boys and girls, a hall (Dewan Boestamam) where the weekly assembly is held. The school has a new building to accommodate the increased number of students.

See also 
 List of schools in Malaysia
 Official website

External links 
 http://smkab.org/smkab/
 Project Sitiawan, networking Sitiawanians

Schools in Perak
Secondary schools in Malaysia
1972 establishments in Malaysia